is a type of pickled daikon popular in Tokyo, a sort of tsukemono.  It is made by pickling daikon with sugar, salt, and sake without filtering koji.  The name bettarazuke is taken from the stickiness of koji left over from the pickling process.  Bettarazuke has a crisp sweet taste.
Bettarazuke has similar figure to takuan, but bettarazuke contains a lot of moisture because it doesn't need sun-drying process.

On the night of every October 19 in the area around Takarada Ebisu shrine, Bettara Ichi (literally, "bettara fair") is held to sell the year's freshly pickled bettarazuke.

References

Japanese pickles